The Th!nk City is an electric city car that was produced by Norwegian carmaker Think Global, and production partner Valmet Automotive from 2008 to 2012.

As of early 2011, the Th!nk was one of only five crash-tested, mass-produced, and highway-certified electric cars in the world, together with the Tesla Roadster (2008), the Mitsubishi i-MiEV, the Nissan Leaf and the Smart ED. The Th!nk City was sold in Norway, the Netherlands, Spain, France, Austria, Switzerland, Finland, the United Kingdom  and the United States. , a total of 2,500 units had been manufactured at Oslo-based TH!NK's production facility. Norway was the leading market with 1,120 units registered through September 2013.

Due to financial difficulties, production of the Th!nk City in Finland was stopped in March 2011, and the company filed for bankruptcy on June 22, 2011, for the fourth time in 20 years. Think Global was purchased soon after by Electric Mobility Solutions AS, which announced production to resume in early 2012 with a refined Think City. However, production never resumed, and the Indiana plant completed its final car in August 2012.



History
The production Think City is closely related to the trial Ford Think City produced in 2000–2002 during Ford's ownership of the company.

The Th!nk City was exhibited for the first time in the UK in July 2008. At the 2008 Geneva Motor Show, Think announced that the Th!nk City would be launched in Denmark and Sweden in 2008, followed by launching in the UK, Germany, Italy and the Netherlands in 2009.

At the 2008 British International Motor Show at the ExCeL Exhibition Centre, London, THINK announced that the Th!nk City will be available to UK customers from the summer of 2009. Prime Minister Gordon Brown joined Transport Minister Geoff Hoon for a presentation by managing director of Think UK.

Specifications

The car has a 24 kWh traction battery and inbuilt charger, and will re-charge from a standard 230 volt, 10 or 16 amp supply in 9.5–10 hours.

 Motor: 3-phase electric induction motor.
 Gear box: Fixed reduction gear, permanently connected to drive wheels. Ratio 1:10,15.
 Front disc brakes and rear drum brakes. ABS Power brakes with electric pump w/ regenerative braking.
 Steering Type: Electrohydraulic power steering with fluid reservoir in motor compartment. Steering rack with power steering. Turning diameter: 29.5 ft.
 Curb weight: ; load capacity with passengers: ; Total weight

Production

Think Global originally planned to start deliveries to Norwegian customers in the last quarter of 2007. That target was missed, but as of August 2008 some 100 electric cars had been manufactured for customers in Norway.
On December 15, 2008, the carmaker suspended all vehicle production and laid off 50% of its staff pending negotiation of up to  million in funding for working capital, citing "urgent financial distress." Production of the Th!nk City restarted on December 10, 2009, at Valmet Automotive in Uusikaupunki, Finland. In October 2010 production had reached 2,500 units, making the Th!nk City one of the world's best selling pure electric cars.

On November 24, 2010, Think North America began manufacturing in the Magnum Drive plant located in Elkhart, Indiana. Initially the Finland plant manufactures the body and wheels on the chassis, then ships them to the United States. The lithium-ion battery, made by EnerDel in Indianapolis, the motor and gearbox, seats, headlights and other components are assembled in the Elkhart plant. Each car takes about a week to complete.

Due to financial difficulties, production of the Th!nk City in Finland was stopped in March 2011, and the company filed for bankruptcy in Norway on June 22, 2011, for the fourth time in 20 years. Although Think North America is a separate entity, its future also is in doubt because it is financially supported by the headquarters in Norway. Production in the Elkhart plant was halted a few days before the bankruptcy filing due to delays in the delivery of parts required to assemble the electric cars.

Think Global's assets were bought by Electric Mobility Solutions AS in July 2011, including shares of wholly owned subsidiaries THINK North America and THINK UK. The new owners announced that production is scheduled to restart in early 2012 with a refined Think City.

Sales and price

Europe
As of September 2010 the Th!nk City was on sale in Norway, the Netherlands, Spain, France, Austria, Switzerland and Finland.

Norway
During 2011 a total of 133 units were sold in Norway. , Th!nk City/PIV 4 registrations totaled 1,120 units.

Finland

France
During 2010 a total of 11 units were registered in France. A total of 110 units were sold in 2011.

United States
The Th!nk City retail price was  before any applicable federal and local incentives. However, due to the higher cost of low production, Think USA announced that the price of the first 100 units was  before any incentives. The first 100 Th!nks were delivered in late 2010 mostly to fleet customers in Indiana. Sales to the general public were expected to begin by mid-2011. Think North America issued three recalls on the first cars produced at the Elkhart plant for defects to its gear shift levers, seat belts and defrosting systems.

The company expected to sell 2,000 to 3,000 cars in 2011 via three to five branded stores in five markets: Southern California, the San Francisco Bay Area, New York City, Washington, D.C. and Indianapolis, and planned to market the electric car as an urban city car.

Following the bankruptcy of Think Global, the remaining 150 Th!nk cars in stock in the U.S. were put on nationwide sale at a discounted price of  before any federal and local incentives.

See also
Ford TH!NK City
Government incentives for plug-in electric vehicles
List of electric cars currently available
List of modern production plug-in electric vehicles
List of production battery electric vehicles
Zero-emissions vehicle
Think Global

References

External links

Electric Mobility Solutions AS website
Video of production starting in Indiana, US

Electric city cars
Production electric cars
Cars introduced in 2001
Cars introduced in 2008
Cars introduced in 2010
Cars discontinued in 2012
2010s cars
CARB's ZEV Mandate